Tiago Coelho Andrade (born 5 May 1992), commonly known as Tiago Cametá is a Brazilian footballer who plays as a right back.

Club career
Born in Cametá, Cametá started his career with Remo in the Brazilian fourth tier in 2012. In January 2013, he moved to Série A club Ponte Preta. On 13 July, he made his debut in a 0–0 draw against Bahia.

In order to gain more first team appearances, Cametá joined Série C (third tier) club Vila Nova on 27 August 2013, after agreeing to a season long loan deal. After appearing 11 times for the club in the campaign, he moved to Fortaleza of the same tier on 21 December 2013. On 5 May 2014, he scored his first and only league goal in a 2–1 home victory against Cuiabá.

Cametá moved to Ceará on 15 December 2014 for the 2015 season. On 28 October 2017, the club announced that he was suspended from the squad for the rest of the season due to disciplinary reasons.

On 8 January 2018, Cametá joined Avaí Futebol Clube on a one year loan deal. However, he cut short his loan deal and instead joined Brasil de Pelotas on loan on 24 April.

On 24 December 2022, Cametá was released by Alashkert.

Career statistics

References

External links
Ceará Sporting Club profile

1992 births
Living people
Association football defenders
Brazilian footballers
Clube do Remo players
Associação Atlética Ponte Preta players
Vila Nova Futebol Clube players
Fortaleza Esporte Clube players
Ceará Sporting Club players
Avaí FC players
Grêmio Esportivo Brasil players
FC Alashkert players
Campeonato Brasileiro Série A players
Campeonato Brasileiro Série B players
Campeonato Brasileiro Série C players
Campeonato Brasileiro Série D players
Sportspeople from Pará